Andy McKenzie (born August 16, 1970) is an American politician, former mayor of Wheeling, West Virginia. He previously served in the West Virginia State Senate from 1996 to 2008 for the 1st district as a Republican.

He has an MBA from West Virginia University.

References

1970 births
West Virginia University alumni
Republican Party West Virginia state senators
Politicians from Wheeling, West Virginia
Living people
Mayors of places in West Virginia
21st-century American politicians